The Broad Street Historic District is a historic district in Center City, Philadelphia, Pennsylvania. It is bounded roughly by Juniper, Cherry, 15th, and Pine Streets, covering an area about one block on either side of Broad Street.

The district was listed on the National Register of Historic Places in 1984.

Contributing properties

Academy of Music (Philadelphia)
Land Title Building
Masonic Temple
Pennsylvania Academy of the Fine Arts
Philadelphia City Hall
Philadelphia National Bank Building
Philadelphia Stock Exchange
Philadelphia College of Art
Union League of Philadelphia

See also

 Broad Street (Philadelphia)

References

External links
District Map, Pennsylvania Historical and Museum Commission
[ NRHP Inventory], Pennsylvania Historical and Museum Commission

Beaux-Arts architecture in Pennsylvania
Victorian architecture in Pennsylvania
Historic districts in Philadelphia
Center City, Philadelphia
Historic districts on the National Register of Historic Places in Pennsylvania
National Register of Historic Places in Philadelphia